Baijnath is a town in the Kangra district of Himachal Pradesh, India. It is about 50 kilometers from district headquarters, Dharamshala. A temple of Lord Shiva (Baijnath) is situated there giving the town its name.

Geography
Baijnath is a small township in the Dhauladhar range of the western Himalayas, 16 km from Palampur in Kangra District. It is also near Ravana. Other neighbouring towns are Paprola, Kangra (51 km) and Joginder Nagar.

Baijnath Temple

The main attraction of Baijnath is Baijnath Temple, a temple of Lord Shiva.

Other temples

Other shrines included Mukut Nath temple at Sansal (6 km), Awahi Nag temple (1.5 km), and Mahankal Temple (5 km) at Mahankal.  

Tibetan monasteries are located at Sherabling (Bhattu) (5 km), Chauntra and Chowgan.

References

External links

 Shiv Temple, Baijnath

Cities and towns in Kangra district
Tourism in Himachal Pradesh
Hindu pilgrimage sites in India